Francis Bedford (1815 in London – 15 May 1894) was one of England's most prominent landscape photographers and the first to accompany a royal tour.

Early life
Bedford was the eldest son of the successful church architect Francis Octavius Bedford. He was christened at St Giles in Camberwell on 11 September 1815. He began his career as an architectural draughtsman and lithographer, before taking up photography in the early 1850s.

Career
He helped to found the Royal Photographic Society in 1853.  In 1854, at Marlborough House Queen Victoria commissioned him to photograph objects in the royal collection and in 1857 she commissioned him to photograph her husband Prince Albert's hometown of Coburg, Germany. There followed several more royal commissions, and his series of stereographs of England and Wales have come to be regarded as some of the finest landscape works of their time. Following the death of Prince Albert in 1861 his eldest son, Prince Albert (later King Edward VII), invited Bedford to photograph his extensive tour of Greece and the Middle East, the first royal tour to be photographically documented.

For much of his career Bedford tended towards photography as an art form, painting in clouds, enhancing fine detail with pencil or brushes, and using tissue paper to darken negatives to improve lighting, but by the late 1870s, he was an advocate of simplicity. Between 1851 and 1894 he produced nearly 9,000 wet collodion negatives and albumen prints, making him one of the most prolific landscape photographers of his time.

Personal life

On 1 November 1843 he married Mary Graham at St Andrew's in Holborn, London. The couple appear on the 1851 census living at 23 Rochester Road, Kentish Town, London, with their two young sons, Arthur and William. Francis gave 'Lithographic Artist' as his profession. When the 1861 census was taken, Francis, now an 'Artist', was staying at a hotel in Peterborough. Ten years later he and Mary were living at 326 Camden Road, London. Francis now gave 'Photographic Artist' as his profession. He was still at the same address in 1881. Also present that night were his wife Mary, his son William, his daughter-in-law Wilhelmina, and his six-year-old grandson Francis.

He died on 15 May 1894 and is buried on the west side of Highgate Cemetery, close to the grave of another celebrated Victorian photographer, Henry White.

Photography records
On 19 February 2009 Swann Galleries set an auction record for Bedford's work Photographic Pictures Made by Mr. Francis Bedford During the Tour in the East, a suite of three albums from 1862. The albums sold for $132,000.

Collections 

 Duke University Libraries
 National Gallery of Art, Department of Image Collections
 The Royal Collection
 Museum of Modern Art
 National Galleries of Scotland
 J. Paul Getty Museum
Ryerson Image Centre

Gallery

References

1816 births
1894 deaths
Burials at Highgate Cemetery
19th-century English photographers
Photographers from London
Early photographers in Palestine